PA25 may refer to:
 Pennsylvania Route 25
 Pennsylvania's 25th congressional district
 Piper PA-25 Pawnee